The Hippocrates Med Review (HMR) is an independent student journal at the Johns Hopkins University in Baltimore, Maryland. Founded in 2016, the Hippocrates Med Review is a medical journal that promotes patient education. They were the recipient of the Johns Hopkins University Ten by Twenty Idealab Challenge put out by President Ronald J. Daniels.

The review is published every semester in a full-color magazine format. Its total circulation is approximately 1,200, including the local campuses of Johns Hopkins, area colleges, and private hospitals in the greater Baltimore region. A mobile app was released on April 18, 2018. It also launched the Osler Medical Symposium, a student-run lecture series that calls on prominent leaders in medicine to speak about the current state of medicine.

In 2021, the review expanded to the University of Pittsburgh. marking its first chapter outside of Johns Hopkins University.

Awards 
Johns Hopkins' President Ronald J. Daniels issued a challenge to the community to offer ideas to advance one of the priorities of the university's Ten by Twenty vision, offering $20,000 to the top two ideas to bring their ideas to fruition. Hippocrates Med Review, a start up at the time, was chosen as one of the two winners for this Ten by Twenty IdeaLab Challenge.

References

External links
 

2016 establishments in Maryland
Johns Hopkins University
Magazines established in 2016
Magazines published in Baltimore
Medical magazines
Student magazines published in the United States